Aeropedellus variegatus is a species of Palearctic grasshoppers in the tribe Gomphocerini.

Subspecies 
The Orthoptera Species File includes:
 A. variegatus fasciatus Mistshenko, 1951
 A. variegatus borealis Mistshenko, 1951
 A. variegatus gelidus Mistshenko, 1951
 A. variegatus minutus Mistshenko, 1951
 A. variegatus variegatus (Fischer von Waldheim, 1846): extends into mainland western Europe, where it may be called Le Gomphocère des moraines (Fr) or Alpen-Keulenschrecke (De).

References

External links 
 

Orthoptera of Europe 
Orthoptera of Asia 
Gomphocerinae